Dan Antolik is an American football coach. He is the offensive line coach at Christopher Newport University in Newport News, Virginia. Antolik served as the head football coach at New Mexico Highlands University in Las Vegas, New Mexico from 1976 to 1978, Saint Paul's College in Lawrenceville, Virginia from 1982 to 1986, and Bridgewater College in Bridgewater, Virginia, from 1986 to 1991, compiling a career college football head coaching record of 50–90–2. Antolik was the offensive line coach at University of Nebraska–Kearney from 2017 to 2019. He retired after the 2019 season, but returned to coaching in 2022.

Antolik also served as the head coach at Lafayette High School in Virginia Mancos High School in Colorado, and Currituck High School in North Carolina.

Head coaching record

College

References

External links
 Christopher Newport profile
 Fort Lewis Hall of Fame profile

Year of birth missing (living people)
Living people
Bridgewater Eagles football coaches
Christopher Newport Captains football coaches
Fort Lewis Skyhawks football coaches
Fort Lewis Skyhawks football players
Hampton Pirates football coaches
Nebraska–Kearney Lopers football coaches
New Mexico Highlands Cowboys football coaches
New Mexico Military Broncos football coaches
Saint Paul's Tigers football coaches
Salem Tigers football coaches
High school football coaches in Colorado
High school football coaches in North Carolina
High school football coaches in Virginia